Alfonso Sánchez may refer to:

 Alfonso Sánchez (athlete) (1891–?), Chilean long-distance runner
 Alfonso Sánchez (Andorran footballer) (born 1974), Andorran football player
 Alfonso Emilio Sánchez (born 1994), Mexican footballer
 Alfonso Sánchez Anaya (born 1941), Mexican politician
 Alfonso Sánchez Izquierdo (born 1949), Spanish journalist and broadcast executive

See also
 Alfonso Sánchez-Tabernero (born 1961), president of the University of Navarra